Wivenhoe is a town in England.

Wivenhoe may also refer to:

Australia 
 Wivenhoe Pocket, a rural district in the Somerset Region of Queensland (sometimes simply known as Wivenhoe)
 Lake Wivenhoe, a lake in Queensland formed by Wivehoe Dam on the Brisbane River
 Wivenhoe Dam, the dam on the Brisbane River, Queensland that creates Lake Wivenhoe
 Wivenhoe Power Station, situated on Lake Wivenhoe
 Wivenhoe, Narellan, historic house in New South Wales
 Wivenhoe, Tasmania, a locality in Tasmania

Canada 
Wivenhoe station (Manitoba), a railway station in Wivenhoe, Manitoba

United Kingdom 
 Wivenhoe railway station, on the Colchester to Clacton Line
 Wivenhoe Park, located in Colchester, East of England
 Wivenhoe Town F.C., a football club from Wivenhoe, Essex, England